Nangal Naraingarh  is a village in Kapurthala district of Punjab State, India. The village is administrated by a Sarpanch who is an elected representative of village as per the constitution of India and Panchayati raj (India).

Demography 
According to the report published by Census India in 2011, Nangal Naraingarh had a total number of 28 houses and population of 148, which included 81 males and 67 females. Literacy rate of Nangal Naraingarh was 68.55%, lower than the state average of 75.84%.  The population of children under the age of 6 years was 24 which was 16.22% of the total population of Nangal Naraingarh, and child sex ratio was approximately  846, equal to the state average of 846.

Population data

Air travel connectivity 
The closest airport to the village is Sri Guru Ram Dass Jee International Airport.

Villages in Kapurthala

References

External links
  Villages in Kapurthala
 Kapurthala Villages List

Villages in Kapurthala district